Electoral district no. 5 is one of the 12 multi-member electoral districts of the Riigikogu, the national legislature of Estonia. The district was established as electoral district no. 6 in 1992 when the Riigikogu was re-established following Estonia's independence from the Soviet Union. It was renamed electoral district no. 5 in 1995 following the re-organisation of electoral districts. It is conterminous with the counties of Hiiu, Lääne and Saare. The district currently elects six of the 101 members of the Riigikogu using the open party-list proportional representation electoral system. At the 2019 parliamentary election it had 51,093 registered electors.

Electoral system
Electoral district no. 5 currently elects six of the 101 members of the Riigikogu using the open party-list proportional representation electoral system. The allocation of seats is carried out in three stages. In the first stage, any individual candidate, regardless of whether they are a party or independent candidate, who receives more votes than the district's simple quota (Hare quota: valid votes in district/number of seats allocated to district) is elected via a personal mandate. In the second stage, district mandates are allocated to parties by dividing their district votes by the district's simple quota. Only parties that reach the 5% national threshold compete for district mandates and any personal mandates won by the party are subtracted from the party's district mandates. Prior to 2003 if a party's surplus/remainder votes was equal to or greater than 75% of the district's simple quota it received one additional district mandate. Any unallocated district seats are added to a national pool of compensatory seats. In the final stage, compensatory mandates are calculated based on the national vote and using a modified D'Hondt method. Only parties that reach the 5% national threshold compete for compensatory seats and any personal and district mandates won by the party are subtracted from the party's compensatory mandates. Though calculated nationally, compensatory mandates are allocated at the district level.

Seats
Seats allocated to electoral district no. 5 by the National Electoral Committee of Estonia at each election was as follows:
 2023 - 6
 2019 - 6
 2015 - 6
 2011 - 6
 2007 - 7
 2003 - 7
 1999 - 7
 1995 - 8
 1992 - 8

Election results

Summary

(Excludes compensatory seats)

Detailed

2023
Results of the 2023 parliamentary election held on 3 March 2019:

The following candidates were elected:
 District mandates -  Helle-Moonika Helme (EKRE), 3,275 votes; Madis Kallas (SDE), 2,254 votes;  Kalle Laanet (REF), 4,523 votes; and Grigore-Kalev Stoicescu (EE200), 3,664 votes;.
 Compensatory mandates - Jaanus Karilaid (K), 2,162 votes.

2019
Results of the 2019 parliamentary election held on 3 March 2019:

The following candidates were elected:
 District mandates - Enn Eesmaa (K), 1,805 votes; Helle-Moonika Helme (EKRE), 3,202 votes; and Kalle Laanet (RE), 3,344 votes.
 Compensatory mandates - Jaanus Karilaid (K), 1,661 votes; Heiki Kranich (RE), 390 votes; and Urve Tiidus (RE), 2,617 votes.

2015
Results of the 2015 parliamentary election held on 1 March 2015:

The following candidates were elected:
 District mandates - Raivo Aeg (IRL), 2,001 votes; Andres Ammas (EVA), 1,859 votes; Enn Eesmaa (K), 2,219 votes; Hannes Hanso (SDE), 2,038 votes; Kalle Laanet (RE), 2,388 votes; and Urve Tiidus (RE), 4,117 votes.
 Compensatory mandates - Lauri Luik (RE), 855 votes.

2011
Results of the 2011 parliamentary election held on 6 March 2011:

The following candidates were elected:
 District mandates - Kalle Laanet (K), 2,566 votes; Tõnis Palts (IRL), 2.243 votes; Neeme Suur (SDE), 1,970 votes; Jaanus Tamkivi (RE), 3,171 votes; and Urve Tiidus (RE), 3,123 votes.
 Compensatory mandates - Kalev Kotkas (SDE), 1,565 votes; Kajar Lember (SDE), 1,363 votes; and Lauri Luik (RE), 1,931 votes.

2007
Results of the 2007 parliamentary election held on 4 March 2007:

The following candidates were elected:
 District mandates - Tarmo Kõuts (IRL), 2,847 votes; Ain Seppik (K), 3,989 votes; Imre Sooäär (RE), 1,778 votes; Jaanus Tamkivi (RE), 3,615 votes; and Andres Tarand (SDE), 1,132 votes.
 Compensatory mandates - Aleksei Lotman (EER), 1,316 votes; and Lauri Luik (RE), 1,310 votes.

2003
Results of the 2003 parliamentary election held on 2 March 2003:

The following candidates were elected:
 District mandates - Andres Lipstok (RE), 2,037 votes; Jüri Saar (ERL), 2,364 votes; Ain Seppik (K), 3,216 votes; Imre Sooäär (ÜVE-RP), 982 votes; and Olari Taal (ÜVE-RP), 3,816 votes.

1999
Results of the 1999 parliamentary election held on 7 March 1999:

The following candidates were elected:
 District mandates - Kalev Kotkas (M), 1,730 votes; Anti Liiv (K), 3,682 votes; and Andres Lipstok (RE), 3,376 votes.
 Compensatory mandates - Vambo Kaal (M), 1,584 votes; Mart Nutt (I), 1,393 votes; Tiit Tammsaar (EME), 1,555 votes; and Laine Tarvis (K), 2,452 votes.

1995
Results of the 1995 parliamentary election held on 5 March 1995:

The following candidates were elected:
 Personal mandates - Andres Lipstok (RE), 6,289 votes.
 District mandates - Raivo Kallas (KMÜ), 2,139 votes; Anti Liiv (K), 3,193 votes; and Ülo Uluots (KMÜ), 2,753 votes.
 Compensatory mandates - Jürgen Ligi (RE), 460 votes; and Daimar Liiv (RE), 181 votes.

1992
Results of the 1992 parliamentary election held on 20 September 1992:

The following candidates were elected:
 Personal mandates - Kirill Teiter (SK), 6,314 votes.
 District mandates - Heiki Kranich (I), 1,335 votes.
 Compensatory mandates - Rein Hanson (KK), 2,120 votes; Rein Helme (EK), 196 votes; Vambo Kaal (M), 1,252 votes; Krista Kilvet (R), 670 votes; Jüri Põld (I), 1,041 votes; and Aime Sügis (EK), 69 votes.

References

Riigikogu electoral district
Riigikogu electoral district
05
05
Riigikogu electoral district